A brushfire or brush fire is a type of wildfire.

Brushfire may also refer to:

 Brushfire (film), a 1962 jungle warfare film
 Brushfire: Illuminations from the Inferno, a sequel to the art book Barlowe's Inferno

See also
 Brushfire Records, a record label
 Brushfire Fairytales, an album by Jack Johnson
 Low-intensity conflict